Vosean Joseph (born December 15, 1997) is an American football linebacker for the Hamilton Tiger-Cats of the Canadian Football League (CFL). He played college football at Florida.

Early years
Joseph attended Miami Norland Senior High School in Miami, Florida. He committed to the University of Florida to play college football.

College career
Joseph played at Florida from 2016 to 2018. During his career, he had 161 tackles, four sacks and one interception. After his junior season in 2018, he entered the 2019 NFL Draft.

Professional career

Buffalo Bills
Joseph was drafted by the Buffalo Bills in the fifth round, 147th overall, of the 2019 NFL Draft. He was placed on injured reserve on August 31, 2019.

On September 4, 2020, Joseph was waived by the Bills.

Hamilton Tiger-Cats
Joseph signed with the Hamilton Tiger-Cats of the Canadian Football League for the 2022 season.

References

External links
Florida Gators bio

1997 births
Living people
Players of American football from Miami
Miami Norland Senior High School alumni
American football linebackers
Florida Gators football players
Buffalo Bills players